Hagley College (previously Hagley Community College and Hagley High School), is a state secondary school in inner-city Christchurch, New Zealand. Prior to 1966 the school was Christchurch West High School, which was founded in 1858.

Description

Unlike most New Zealand high schools there is no uniform requirement and students may address their teachers on a first name basis. Over 92% of students leave with qualifications and a substantially greater proportion than the national average go on to graduate from a New Zealand university.

The 1950s school hall has been transformed into a theatre, and former rooms of the school are now in use as a dance studio and drama studio. As well as the usual NCEA subjects, Hagley offers several specialised programmes, including Early Childhood Education, Hagley Dance Company, Hagley Writers' Institute and Hagley School of Cuisine.

The school is listed with the New Zealand Qualifications Authority.

Main building
The school's main building was registered as a heritage building by the New Zealand Historic Places Trust (now Heritage New Zealand) on 26 November 1981 with registration number 1874 classified as C. With the change of the classification system, the building later became a Category II listing.

Principal Brent Ingram lobbied the Ministry of Education in the 1990s to have the main building earthquake-strengthened. The double-brick building dating from 1924 was an earthquake risk, as reports first identified in the 1960s. When the Ministry disagreed, Ingram took the case first to the Ombudsman and then filed proceedings in the High Court before the Ministry relented and agreed to the strengthening. About NZ$4.2m was spent on the strengthening work. The building came through the February 2011 Christchurch earthquake reasonably unharmed and, according to Ingram, "didn't lose a brick".

Principals

Notable alumni
 Jarred Christmas (born 1980), comedian active in the United Kingdom
 Sandra Manderson, retired police officer and police commander

References

External links

Official Site
Education Review Office (ERO) reports

Secondary schools in Christchurch
Christchurch Central City